Khambhaliya is one of the 182 Legislative Assembly constituencies of Gujarat state in India. It is part of Devbhoomi Dwarka district.

List of segments
This assembly seat represents the following segments,

 Khambhalia Taluka
 Bhanvad Taluka (Part) All Villages except – Manpar, Jogra, Chokhanda, Bhangol, Bhoria, Kabarka, Shedhakhai, Bodki, Fotdi, Dharagar, Krushnagadh, Vanavad, Katkola

Members of Vidhan Sabha

Election results

2022

2017

2014 (By-poll)

2012

See also
 List of constituencies of Gujarat Legislative Assembly
 Gujarat Legislative Assembly

References

External links
 

Assembly constituencies of Gujarat
Devbhoomi Dwarka district